Kuna Srisailam Goud (born 17 June 1966) is an Indian politician from BJP (Bharatiya Janata Party). He joined BJP in 2021. He was the Congress Party Telangana PCC TPCC leader from 2009 to 2021. He was a member of
Legislative Assembly from Quthbullapur Constituency as an Independent candidate and joined Congress INC in 2009.

He is now working under the leadership of Telangana State BJP President Bandi Sanjay Kumar.

References
 

Indian National Congress politicians
1965 births
Living people